Daniel Davis House and Barn, also known as Fair Meadow, is a historic home and barn located in Birmingham Township, Chester County, Pennsylvania. The serpentine core of the house was built in 1740.  It is a -story, three-bay, double-pile dwelling with a gable roof.  It has a -story, three-bay wing with a gable roof and a frame addition constructed in 1935.  The barn is also constructed of serpentine and is a bank barn structure.

It was added to the National Register of Historic Places in 1973.

References

Houses on the National Register of Historic Places in Pennsylvania
Barns on the National Register of Historic Places in Pennsylvania
Houses completed in 1740
Houses in Chester County, Pennsylvania
Barns in Pennsylvania
National Register of Historic Places in Chester County, Pennsylvania
1740 establishments in Pennsylvania